TP-Seinäjoki is a football club based in Seinäjoki, Finland. It was established in 1955 as Törnävän Pallo-55 (TP-55). The name was changed in 1994.

TP-Seinäjoki played one season in the Finnish premier division Veikkausliiga in 1997. Since 2007 the club has focused on junior level football. The senior section is today controlled by SJK, which currently plays in the Finnish top tier Veikkausliiga.

Season to season

1 seasons in Veikkausliiga
10 seasons in Ykkönen
12 seasons in Kakkonen
20 seasons in Fourth Tier
8 seasons in Fifth Tier

References

External links 
TP-Seinäjoki homepage

Football clubs in Finland
Association football clubs established in 1955
Seinäjoen Jalkapallokerho
1955 establishments in Finland